The following games were initially announced as Wii U titles, however were subsequently cancelled or postponed indefinitely by developers or publishers.

References

 
Wii U games
Wii U